The enzyme 2′,3′-cyclic-nucleotide 2'-phosphodiesterase (EC 3.1.4.16) catalyzes the reaction 

nucleoside 2′,3′-cyclic phosphate + H2O  nucleoside 3′-phosphate

This enzyme belongs to the family of hydrolases, specifically those acting on phosphoric diester bonds.  The systematic name is nucleoside-2′,3′-cyclic-phosphate 3'-nucleotidohydrolase. Other names in common use include ribonucleoside 2′,3′-cyclic phosphate diesterase, 2′,3′-cyclic AMP phosphodiesterase, 2′,3′-cyclic nucleotidase, cyclic 2′,3′-nucleotide 2′-phosphodiesterase, cyclic 2′,3′-nucleotide phosphodiesterase, 2′,3′-cyclic nucleoside monophosphate phosphodiesterase, 2′,3′-cyclic AMP 2′-phosphohydrolase, cyclic phosphodiesterase:3′-nucleotidase, 2′,3′-cyclic nucleotide phosphohydrolase, 2′:3′-cyclic phosphodiesterase, and 2′:3′-cyclic nucleotide phosphodiesterase:3'-nucleotidase.  This enzyme participates in purine metabolism and pyrimidine metabolism.

References

 
 
 
 
 

EC 3.1.4
Enzymes of unknown structure